Code of Points may refer to:

 Code of Points (artistic gymnastics)
 Alternative name for the ISU Judging System, scoring system currently used to judge figure skating